This is a list of Brazilian entrepreneurs, businesspeople of Brazilian nationality or with Brazilian citizenship.

 Abílio Diniz
 Alexandra Gama
 Aloysio de Andrade Faria
 Andre Medici
 Antônio Ermírio de Moraes
 Ara Vartanian
 André Esteves
 Armínio Fraga
 Assis Chateaubriand
 Bob Falkenburg
 Carlos Ghosn
 Carlos Alberto Sicupira
 Edmond Safra
 Eduardo Saverin
 Eike Batista
 Count Francesco Matarazzo
 Germán Efromovich
 Gustavo Franco
 Henrique Meirelles
 Hugo Barra
 João Carlos di Genio
 Jorge Paulo Lemann
 José Alencar
 Julio Bozano
 Luciano Hang
 Marcel Herrmann Telles
 Mike Krieger
 Norberto Odebrecht
Olacyr de Moraes (in portuguese)
 Pedro Moreira Salles
 Ricardo Semler
 Roberto Marinho
 Samuel Klein
 Victor Civita
 Walter Moreira Salles

Entrepreneurs
Entrepreneurs
Brazilian